Kuttichathan is a demigod in the folklore of Malabari Hindus, depicted as a portly adolescent boy, sometimes described as having a kutumi. Kuttichathan's tricks (such as turning food into excrement, and beds turning into beds of thorn) cause great trouble to his victims but never do serious harm. He is said to demand food in exchange for freedom from his harassment. Most of the chathan temples in Kerala belong to the Kalari Panicker and Thiyya castes.

Some Hindus in Malabar believe that sacrificing a cockerel on a regular basis with the correct incantations will appease Kuttichathan, and that he will otherwise terrorize their families. Kuttichathan also appears in pop culture, such as in the 1984 Malayalam film My Dear Kuttichathan.

See also
Kuttichathan Theyyam

References

External links 

 Therayattam – Worship Dances of Malabar. A 1958 documentary showing worship dances of Malabar, with a dance dedicated to Kuttichathan shown at 09:30. Indian Ministry of Information, OCLC 4702509.

Demons